The Oxford School District is a public school district based in Oxford, Mississippi.

Its boundary includes almost all of Oxford, the University census-designated place, and some unincorporated areas.

School board
The district is governed by a six-member elected board of trustees. There are two Office of the Board positions, President and Secretary, that are annually elected by the district for one-year terms at the end of each fiscal year. By law, at least two board members must be appointed by the Board of Alderman and remaining members are elected by county residents living within the Municipal Separate School District. As of May 2017 the school board members are: S. Ray Hill; Marian Barksdale, President; Romana Reed; Brian Harvey, Superintendent; Gray Edmondson, Secretary; and Scott Shipman.

Superintendent
The superintendent is voted on and elected by the school board. From 2013 through 2017 the superintendent was Brian Harvey. Harvey graduated from the district in 1990 and worked in the district for 17 years; as a middle and high school teacher, the assistant principal at Oxford High School, and the principal at both Central Elementary and Oxford Middle School. While serving as interim superintendent, Harvey was appointed after the previous superintendent, Kim Stasny, died from a short illness. In 2021, Bradley Robertson was announced as the new superintendent.

Schools
Secondary schools

Oxford High School (Grades 9 through 12)
Oxford Middle School (Grades 7 through 8)

Elementary schools
Oxford Intermediate School (Grades 5 and 6)
Della Davidson Elementary School (Grades 3 and 4)
Central Elementary School (Grades 1 and 2)
Bramlett Elementary School (Grades Pre-K through K)
Central Elementary School was previously known as Oxford Elementary School. The school was renamed in 2019 in order to honor Oxford's African-American school pre-integration, Central High School.

Alternative schools
C.M. Scott Center(Special Needs)
Oxford Learning Center (Grades 6 and 12)

In the Jim Crow era, where white and black students attended separate schools, the "Negro Elementary and High School" housed black students. Construction began and ended in 1938 and 1939, respectively. The Public Works Administration (PWA) was involved in the building of this school.

Demographics

2006-07 school year
There were a total of 3,356 students enrolled in the Oxford School District during the 2006–2007 school year. The gender makeup of the district was 50% female and 50% male. The racial makeup of the district was 43.65% African American, 49.70% White, 2.18% Hispanic, 4.32% Asian, and 0.15% Native American. 41.9% of the district's students were eligible to receive free lunch.

Previous school years

Accountability statistics

District Report Card 
The Mississippi Statewide Accountability System provides performance ratings of A, B, C, D, and F for public school districts in the state, with A as the highest score and F as the lowest.  These ratings are based on established standards such as " student achievement, individual student growth, graduation rate, and participation rate." Data is available from the 2017-2018 school year until the 2020-2021 school year.

See also

List of school districts in Mississippi

References

External links

 
 

Oxford, Mississippi
Education in Lafayette County, Mississippi
School districts in Mississippi